Psyllobora is a genus of fungus-eating lady beetles in the family Coccinellidae. There are about 17 described species in Psyllobora.

Species
These 17 species belong to the genus Psyllobora:
 Psyllobora bisoctonotata (Mulsant, 1850)
 Psyllobora borealis Casey, 1899 i c g b
 Psyllobora bowringi Crotch, 1874 g
 Psyllobora confluens Fabricius, 1801 g
 Psyllobora conspurcata Boheman, 1859 i c g
 Psyllobora costae Mulsant, 1853 g
 Psyllobora intricata Mulsant, 1850 g
 Psyllobora lineola Fabricius, 1792 g
 Psyllobora marshalli Crotch, 1874 g
 Psyllobora nana Mulsant, 1850 i c g b
 Psyllobora parvinotata Casey, 1899 i c g b
 Psyllobora plagiata Schaeffer, 1908 i c g b
 Psyllobora renifer Casey, 1899 i c g b
 Psyllobora schwarzi Chapin, 1957 b
 Psyllobora variegata (Fabricius, 1781) g
 Psyllobora vigintiduopunctata (Linnaeus, 1758) g b (22-spotted lady beetle)
 Psyllobora vigintimaculata (Say, 1824) i c g b (twenty-spotted lady beetle)
Data sources: i = ITIS, c = Catalogue of Life, g = GBIF, b = Bugguide.net

References

External links

 Biolib

Coccinellidae genera
Beetles of Europe
Taxa named by Louis Alexandre Auguste Chevrolat